Anaxipha delicatula, the chirping trig, is a species of winged bush crickets, trigs in the family Trigonidiidae. It is found in North America.

References

Crickets
Articles created by Qbugbot
Insects described in 1878